Stefania Paccagnella  (born ) is a retired Italian volleyball player. She was part of the Italy women's national volleyball team.

She participated in the 1994 FIVB Volleyball Women's World Championship. On club level she played with Foppapedretti Bergamo.

Clubs
 Foppapedretti Bergamo (1994)

References

1973 births
Living people
Italian women's volleyball players
Place of birth missing (living people)